Make My Bed is the debut extended play by American singer-songwriter King Princess. It was released on June 15, 2018 through Zelig Records and Columbia Records. It was promoted by the singles "1950" and "Talia".

Reception
The EP garnered positive reviews from critics. Owen Torrey of Exclaim! compared the EP favorably to the work of Lorde and Troye Sivan and praised the emotional honesty and focus on themes of queer identity and relationships. Jackson Howard of Pitchfork echoed the Lorde and Sivan comparisons and also invited comparisons to Imogen Heap and Jack Antonoff, as well as praising its open discussion of queer sexuality and young adult romance.

Track listing

Personnel

Musicians
King Princess – vocals (all tracks), songwriting (all tracks), production (all tracks), programming (2, 5), bass (tracks 2–5), guitar (tracks 2–4), keyboards (tracks 2–4), synthesizer (track 2), drums (tracks 3, 4)
Mike Malchicoff – production (all tracks)
Nick Long – songwriting (tracks 3, 5), guitar (track 3)
Daniel Gidlung – songwriting (track 4)

Technical
Dave Kutch – mastering engineer (tracks 1–3, 5)
Patrick Karnik – mastering engineer (track 4)
Mike Malchicoff – recording engineer (all tracks), mixing engineer (tracks 1, 3–5)
Tommy Brenneck – mixing engineer (track 5)
Rob Kinelski – mixing engineer (track 2)
David Baker – assistant engineer (track 2)

References

2018 debut EPs
Columbia Records EPs
Electropop EPs
King Princess albums
LGBT-related albums